Bethany Barton is an author and illustrator of children's books.

Barton's 2015 book I’m Trying To Love Spiders (Viking/Penguin) garnered numerous awards and starred reviews, including the 2016 Children's Choice Award 3rd/4th Grade Book of The Year. Her 2017 book Give Bees A Chance (Viking/Penguin) was a 2017 SCIBA Award finalist, was listed in Scripps National Spelling Bee “Great Words, Great Works,” and was featured in the New York Times. Her books have been translated into four languages. Her newest book, I'm Trying to Love Math, was named an Amazon Best Book of 2019  Her newest in the series, I'm Trying To Love Rocks (Viking/Penguin), hit stores in June 2020.

As well as illustrating her own stories, Barton has illustrated for other authors, including Todd Hasak-Lowy's middle grade novel 33 Minutes (Simon & Schuster). She often spends several weeks of the year touring; doing school visits, speaking to authors and educators, and sharing her stories and creativity with young readers at schools and libraries across the globe.

Bethany Barton also has a busy career in the art, prop, and set decoration departments for film & TV. Notable projects include ABC Network's The Muppets, The Middle, Westworld and `black-ish,  as well as movies like Bumblebee, and dozens of commercials.    She is represented by Writers House LLC.

Books 
I'm Trying To Love Rocks, 2020, Viking/Penguin
I'm Trying To Love Math, 2019, Viking/Penguin 
Give Bees A Chance, 2017, Viking/Penguin
I'm Trying To Love Spiders, 2015, Viking/Penguin
33 Minutes, 2013, by Todd Hasak-Lowy, illust. Bethany Barton, 
This Monster Needs A Haircut, 2012, Dial Books For Young Readers (Penguin), 
 This Monster Cannot Wait, 2013, Dial Books For Young Readers (Penguin),

Awards 

 2016 Children's Choice Awards 3rd/4th Grade Book of the Year 
 2017 Beehive Book Award (Children's Literature Association of Utah)
 2016-2017 Black-Eyed Susan Book Award (Maryland Association of School Librarians)
 2017 Kentucky Bluegrass Award (Kentucky Association of School Librarians) 
 2018 Surrey Schools Narrative Non-Fiction Book of The Year (British Columbia) 
 Amazon Best Book of 2020

Nominations 

 SCIBA (Southern California Independent Booksellers Association) 2017 Book Award Finalist
 2017-2018 South Carolina Picture Book Award 
 2016-2017 Charter Oak Children's Book Award 
 2017 Washington Children's Choice Picture Book Award
 2017-2018 North Carolina Children's Book Award 
 2017-2018 Show Me Readers Award (Missouri Association of School Librarians)
 2018 Monarch Award (Illinois School Library Media Association) 
 2018 Garden State Book Award

References

External links 

Official Children's Book Site
Writers House Portfolio
Book Trailer for This Monster Needs A Haircut

1982 births
Living people
American women illustrators
American children's book illustrators
Date of birth missing (living people)
Artists from Chicago